Kendrick Norton Jr. (born June 7, 1997) is a former American football defensive tackle. He played college football at Miami (FL). He was critically injured after being involved in a car accident in July 2019 that caused his left arm to be amputated and effectively ended his NFL career.

College career
At the University of Miami, Norton earned honorable mention All-ACC honors at the conclusion of the 2017 season. He played in all 13 games for the Hurricanes, starting 12 in his junior year, making 26 tackles, 6.5 for loss, and two sacks. Norton was a third-team all-conference selection the previous season, starting all 13 games, compiling 39 tackles, 10 for loss, and two sacks in the middle of the 'Canes defense. The four-star recruit and Under Armour All-American from Jacksonville played in 12 games as a true freshman in 2015, posting 19 tackles and a sack.

Professional career

Carolina Panthers
Norton was drafted by the Carolina Panthers in the seventh round (242nd overall) of the 2018 NFL Draft. He was waived on September 1, 2018, and was signed to the practice squad the next day. He was released on September 6, 2018, but was re-signed four days later.

Miami Dolphins
On December 19, 2018, Norton was signed by the Miami Dolphins off the Panthers practice squad.

On July 22, 2019, the Dolphins waived Norton with a non-football injury designation, but decided to give him a full-season salary. He reverted to the team's reserve/non-football injury list on July 23.

Norton was waived with a non-football injury designation again on March 18, 2020.

Personal life
On July 4, 2019, Norton was involved in a car accident while driving on State Road 836, near Miami. He almost died after sustaining multiple injuries that caused his left arm to be amputated at the scene of the accident. Two days later, the league announced that his medical bills would be covered by a combination of both the league and the Dolphins' insurance.

References

External links
Miami Hurricanes bio

1997 births
Living people
American football defensive tackles
Miami Hurricanes football players
Players of American football from Jacksonville, Florida
Carolina Panthers players
Miami Dolphins players
American amputees
African-American players of American football
21st-century African-American sportspeople